Leonid Milov (Russian: Леонид Васильевич Милов; 28 July 1929, Moscow - 17 November 2007, Moscow) was a prominent Soviet and Russian historian. He worked at the Faculty of History in Lomonosov Moscow State University.

Life and works
His primary scientific interests were history of serfdom and genesis of capitalism in the Russian Empire, but he also specialized in Russian medieval law and Byzantine law. Milov was a pioneer of cliometrics in Russia along with professor Ivan Kovalchenko and others. Author of more than 150 works, in 1998 he published his opus magnum - Russian Plowman and Special Aspects of Russian Historical Process. Having conducted a thorough research of Russian agriculture and peasant life in the 16th and 17th centuries he argued that Russian serfdom as economical institute was a "compensational mechanism for survival". His works on Russian economic history are considered very important today. 
In last years of his life, Milov was in charge of creating a completely new textbook on Russian history based on post-Soviet science. The result was a book in three volumes written by a collective of historians. It was published in 2006.

External links 
  Anton Gorsky in the Memory of Leonid Milov
  A detailed biography on site of Faculty of History in Lomonosov Moscow State University
  Full bibliography from 1957 to 2009

1929 births
2007 deaths